Jessica Moore and Storm Sanders were the defending champions, but decided not to participate this year.

Jamie Loeb and An-Sophie Mestach won the title, defeating Julia Glushko and Olga Govortsova 6–4, 6–4 in the final.

Seeds

Draw

References
Main Draw

Challenger Banque Nationale de Granby
Challenger de Granby